National University of Education Station (aka Gyodae Station) is an underground station of Daegu Subway Line 1 in Daemyeong-dong, Nam District, Daegu, South Korea. It is named for Daegu National University of Education. It is the first station of a city railroad of Daegu connected with this college.

Overview
During construction, the station name was Yeongseon Station. It is easily accessible since it is only about 230m away from Daegu University of Education.

It is a midnight train station on the train going up line 1, and the last train to Seolhwa Myeonggok runs until 23:55 minutes. The next morning, a train to Anseom departs from this station for the first time. When the Daegu subway fire broke out on February 18, 2003, the route between Myeongdeok and Sincheon was suspended for 8 months, and it was used as the starting point for a shuttle bus connecting the sections after the train stopped at this station.

Station layout

External links 
 DTRO virtual station

See also 
 Daegu National University of Education

Railway stations opened in 1997
Daegu Metro stations
Nam District, Daegu